Laureano Figuerola y Ballester (4 July 1816, Calaf - 28 February 1903, Madrid) was a Spanish lawyer, economist and politician who served as the Ministro de Hacienda y Administraciones Públicas (now the Ministro de Economía, Industria y Competitividad) during the Sexenio Democrático. He is best known for officially establishing the peseta as Spain's currency.

Biography 
After completing his studies In philosophy, he took  a Bachelor's degree in Law in 1838, then received his doctorate from the University of Barcelona in 1840. He became a substitute professor of constitutional law there and, in 1845, was promoted to Professor of Administrative Law and Political Economics. In 1853, he became a Professor of Political Economics and Law at the Central University of Madrid.

Four years later, he became one of the first members of the  Real Academia de Ciencias Morales y Políticas (RACMP) and, together with several associates, including José Echegaray and Segismundo Moret, was a founder of the "Sociedad Libre de Economía Política", an organization devoted to the principles of free trade.

After the Revolution of 1868, Francisco Serrano y Dominguez, head of the Provisional Government, named him Ministro de Hacienda, a position he held until early the following year. One of his most important acts was signing the ordinance establishing the peseta as the sole official currency. He headed the same ministry from late 1869 until 1870, when Amedeo I ascended to the throne.

His position in the Cortes had become difficult during his second term as minister, due to opposition from Pi y Margall and others, including businessmen in the industrial sector. Despite the support of his friend, Juan Prim, he felt it was best to  tender his resignation.
 
He was then elected President of the Board of Directors for the Institución Libre de Enseñanza, created by Royal Decree in 1876. He was also one of the first members of the Faculty Board, together with Nicolás Salmerón, Joaquín Costa and Francisco Giner de los Ríos, among others. In 1885, he was elected a Councillor (alderman) for the Ayuntamiento of Madrid. From 1898 until his death, he served as President of RACMP.

Sources 
 "Laureano Figuerola en el campo del honor" by Francisco Cabrillo.
 Alberto Rull Sabater: Diccionario sucinto de Ministros de Hacienda (s.XIX-XX), 1991: Madrid. Instituto de Estudios Fiscales
 Miguel Martorell Linares and Francisco Comín: “Laureano Figuerola: el ministro de Hacienda de la Revolución Gloriosa”, in: Francisco Comín, Pablo Martín-Aceña and Rafael Vallejo (eds.): La Hacienda por sus ministros. La etapa liberal de 1845 a 1899, Zaragoza, PUZ, 2006, pp. 299–339,

External links 

Biography of Figuerola the Charles III University of Madrid website.

1816 births
1903 deaths
Economy and finance ministers of Spain
University of Barcelona alumni
Academic staff of the University of Barcelona
People from Anoia
Presidents of the Senate of Spain